Hege Gunnerød (born 22 November 1973) is a Norwegian former football player who played on the Norway women's national football team that won the 1995 FIFA Women's World Cup in Sweden. At club level she played for 13 seasons with Asker, later coaching the club's youth teams. She emerged from retirement to play as an emergency goalkeeper for Asker in 2006.

References

External links
 
 Norwegian national team profile 

1973 births
Living people
Norwegian women's footballers
Norway women's international footballers
1995 FIFA Women's World Cup players
FIFA Women's World Cup-winning players
Asker Fotball (women) players
Toppserien players
Women's association football defenders
Women's association football midfielders
People from Asker
Sportspeople from Viken (county)